The Taiwan eSports League (TeSL) is a professional eSports league in Taiwan. Played games are broadcast on the Videoland Television Network.

Teams 
 Flash Wolves (Formerly 7-Elevens Ironmen, Xpec Ironmen, and Yoe Ironmen/Flash Wolves or Taichung Flash Wolves)
 Gama Bears (Sen became a member of this team in the 2011–12 season)
 Kaohsiung Ocean Stars
 Tainan Phoenix
 New Taipei City Gold Ore
 Taipei Capital
Tt Apollos
Taoyuan Jets (no longer part of the Starcraft II league since 2011)
Wayi Spiders

Coverage 

TeSL cooperates with the Videoland Television Network.

The Special Force II Pro League is broadcast on Fox Sports 3. The inaugural season kicked off on October 2, 2015.

References 

StarCraft competitions
2008 establishments in Taiwan
Sports governing bodies in Taiwan
Esports competitions in Taiwan
Professional sports leagues in Taiwan